Neefioides rufobasalis is a species of beetles in the family Buprestidae, the jewel beetles. Formerly known as Cisseis rufobasalis, it was transferred to a new monotypic genus of its own, Neefioides, in 2003. This beetle is native to Madagascar.

References

External links

Monotypic Buprestidae genera
Insects of Madagascar